"Let Me Go" is a song by British singer-songwriter Gary Barlow. It was released in Ireland on 15 November 2013 and in the United Kingdom on 17 November 2013 as the lead single from his fourth solo album, Since I Saw You Last (2013). It was written by Barlow and produced by Steve Power. "Let Me Go" peaked at number two in the UK Singles Chart, becoming Barlow's sixth solo top 10 hit in the UK.

Background
In November 2012, Barlow announced a concert tour, Gary Barlow: In Concert, which sold out minutes after going on sale. During these shows Barlow played across the UK, when he began to consider returning to the studio to write what would become his first full-length studio album in over 14 years. As he began writing material for the album, Since I Saw You Last, he wrote "Let Me Go" and knew it should be the lead single.

Barlow revealed in a TV documentary that "Let Me Go" was written about the loss of his stillborn daughter Poppy and the traumatic period in his life  which left him and wife Dawn devastated. He said that the song keeps Poppy's “flame” alive and is a “celebration” of her. Barlow added: “I don't like there to be things that are unsaid really... and from that thing happening to my dad's passing, there's a lot of them in this record with me. It should be a celebration that song, because in some respects, it's alive that record and those lyrics and what it relates to. It keeps a life and a flame in the whole thing.”

"Let Me Go" has been described as an acoustic guitar-driven song with a catchy chorus. It represents a change in musical style to Barlow's past material. He attributes this to his listening of musical influences such as Johnny Cash when deciding which direction he wanted to take his record. He said: "I've always liked folky, acoustic music but I've never fully explored it. I turned back time and was listening to Johnny Cash and early Elton John before I wrote 'Let Me Go'".

Music video
The video was filmed in New York City in September 2013 and was directed by Ben Winston. The video begins with Barlow walking through the streets of Williamsburg, Brooklyn, interacting with passers-by and shop workers trying to locate something. A person directs him to an old shop, which he leaves with a second-hand piano. He then wheels the piano across Brooklyn and places it in the middle of a quiet street. He then leaves the piano and returns with two pieces of wood to use as a seat, before launching into the second verse of the song.

This attracts the attention of the surrounding neighbourhood, with musicians joining in with Barlow and the piano.

Promotion
The song received its first radio play on BBC Radio 2 and Heart Radio on 4 October 2013, with Barlow being in attendance for both radio spins. A lyric video was uploaded onto YouTube later that day. "Let Me Go" was soon placed on the Radio 2 A Playlist and continues to be listed. Barlow also performed on the sixth live results show of The X Factor on 17 November 2013. In addition, he performed the track on The Jonathan Ross Show on 23 November 2013.

Chart performance
Let Me Go entered the UK Singles Chart at number 3 with 72,423 copies sold in its first week on sale, giving Barlow his 21st top 3 UK single. The following week it rose to No. 2 selling a further 60,422 copies. In Scotland the single debuted at number 1, and entered the top ten in the Irish IRMA charts.
For the third week in a row, "Let Me Go" remained in top 5 in the UK charts selling 33,512 copies and remained at no. 2 in the Scottish official chart. During its fourth week of release it once again sold over 30,000 copies, being certified Silver by the BPI. The single has since been certified Gold.

As of November 2020, "Let Me Go" has moved a total of 558,000 units in the United Kingdom, the most for any Barlow single.

Track listing
Digital download
 "Let Me Go" – 3:38

UK CD promo single
 "Let Me Go" (album version) – 3:40
 "Let Me Go" (instrumental version) – 3:40

Credits and personnel
Gary Barlow – songwriter, vocals, additional keyboards, backing vocals
Steve Power – producer
Mark "Spike" Stent – mixer
Ryan Carline – engineer, programming
Rohan Onraet – engineer, percussion, programming
Tim van der Kuil – guitar, banjo, pedal steel guitar
John Parricelli – guitar
Sam Dixon – double bass
Jeremy Stacey – drums
David Arch – piano
Massimo Restaino – accordion
Andy Caine – backing vocals
Ami Richardson – backing vocals
Tony Cousins – mastering

Credits adapted from Since I Saw You Last liner notes.

Charts

Weekly charts

Year-end charts

Certifications

References

2013 singles
Gary Barlow songs
Songs written by Gary Barlow
2013 songs
Song recordings produced by Steve Power
Polydor Records singles
Number-one singles in Scotland